This is a list of all tornadoes that were confirmed by local offices of the National Weather Service in the United States from July to September 2012.

United States yearly total

July

July 3 event

July 4 event

July 5 event

July 9 event

July 10 event

July 12 event

July 13 event

July 14 event

July 15 event

July 17 event

July 18 event

July 20 event

July 21 event

July 23 event

July 24 event

July 26 event

July 28 event

July 29 event

July 30 event

July 31 event

August

August 1 event

August 3 event

August 4 event

August 5 event

August 7 event

August 8 event

August 9 event

August 10 event

August 11 event

August 12 event

August 19 event

August 21 event

August 23 event

August 26 event

August 27 event
This event was related to Hurricane Isaac.

August 29 event
This event was related to Hurricane Isaac.

August 30 event
This event was related to Hurricane Isaac.

August 31 event
This event was related to Hurricane Isaac.

September

September 1 event
The events in IL, AR, MO, and IN were related to Hurricane Isaac.

September 3 event
This event was related to the remnants of Hurricane Isaac.

September 4 event
The event in NJ was related to the remnants of Hurricane Isaac.

September 8 event

September 9 event

September 13 event

September 17 event

September 18 event

September 25 event

September 27 event

September 29 event

September 30 event

See also
 Tornadoes of 2012

References

 07
2012-07
Tornado,2012-07
2012, 07
Tornado
Tornado
Tornado